Foothill Elementary School may refer to a number of elementary schools:

 Foothill Elementary School, Boulder, Colorado, part of Boulder Valley School District
 Foothill Elementary School, Corona, California, part of Corona-Norco Unified School District
 Foothill Elementary School, Monterey, California, part of Monterey Peninsula Unified School District
 Foothill Elementary School, Pittsburg, California, part of Pittsburg Unified School District
 Foothill Elementary School, Riverside, California, part of Alvord Unified School District
 Foothill Elementary School, Santa Barbara, California, part of Goleta Union School District
 Foothill Elementary School, Saratoga, California, part of Saratoga Union Elementary School District

See also 
 Foothill High School (disambiguation)